The mayor of Dipolog is the head of the executive branch of Dipolog's government. The mayor holds office at the Dipolog City Hall.

Like all local government heads in the Philippines, the mayor is elected via popular vote, and may not be elected for a fourth consecutive term (although the former mayor may return to office after an interval of one term). In case of death, resignation or incapacity, the vice mayor becomes the mayor.

History
It was said that Dipolog's history as a government unit was established in 1834 when the Spanish Philippine government organized a civil government in the former Province of Misamis. The following capitans were appointed:

For another time, capitan was substituted to gobernadorcillo. The following men who had served the town as such were:

Around January 1889, the Gobernadorcillo position is reverted to capitan before the occurrence of the Philippine Independence of 1898. The following were appointed to the position: 

In 1900, the capitan designation was renamed presidente local, and then renamed again to municipal president from 1901 to the time Dipolog was reverted to a barrio of Dapitan on March 1904. The following served that position:
Martin Fernandez,
Diosdado Mercado, 
Gaudencio Zorilla, and 
Isidro Patangan (Municipal President, 1901 - March 1904).

In 1912, the Governor of the Department of Mindanao and Sulu, General John "Black Jack" Pershing granted the petition of separating Dipolog from Dapitan (which Dipolog was a barrio of since it was reverted to such in 1904), and reorganize as a municipality again. As Dipolog was being created as a municipality in 1913, Municipal President of Dapitan Pascual Tan Martinez, a citizen of Dipolog, was appointed as the Municipal President of Dipolog.

Republic Act No. 5520, the Charter of the City of Dipolog was signed by Philippine President Ferdinand Marcos on June 23, 1969, and Dipolog became a city on January 1, 1970. Felicisimo Herrera, who was Municipal Mayor since 1963, became City Mayor on the day of its cityhood.

Functions and duties
The Local Government Code of 1991 outlines the functions and duties of the city mayor as follows:
Exercise general supervision and control over all programs, projects, services, and activities of the city government;
Enforce all laws and ordinances relative to the governance of the city and in the exercise of the appropriate corporate powers provided for under Section 22 of the Code, implement all approved policies, programs, projects, services and activities of the city;
Initiate and maximize the generation of resources and revenues, and apply the same to the implementation of development plans, program objectives and priorities as provided for under Section 18 of the Code, particularly those resources and revenues programmed for agro-industrial development and countryside growth and progress;
Ensure the delivery of basic services and the provision of adequate facilities as provided for under Section 17 of the Code;
Exercise such other powers and perform such other duties and functions as may be prescribed by law or ordinance.

List

Vice mayor of Dipolog

The Vice Mayor is the second-highest official of the city. The vice mayor is elected via popular vote; although most mayoral candidates have running mates, the vice mayor is elected separately from the mayor. This can result in the mayor and the vice mayor coming from different political parties.

The Vice Mayor is the presiding officer of the Dipolog City Council, although he can only vote as the tiebreaker. When a mayor is removed from office, the vice mayor becomes the mayor until the scheduled next election.

Senen O. Angeles (2004 - 2013, 2022–present) is the currently the vice mayor; he once served as City Councilor (2001 - 2004) and was Zamboanga del Norte Vice Governor (2013 – 2022).

Post-mayoral life
After leaving office, a number of mayors held various public positions and made an effort to remain in the limelight.
Virginio B. Lacaya became Governor of Zamboanga del Norte from 1967 until his retirement from politics in 1980.
Roseller L. Barinaga became Congressman of the 2nd District of Zamboanga del Norte from 1998 until 2007. He ran for Mayor of Dipolog in 2007, 2nd District Congressman in 2010, and City Councilor in 2013 but was lost in those respective positions. He was then appointed as Undersecretary for Mindanao  of the National Anti-Poverty Commission until his resignation to run for 2nd District Board Member of Zamboanga del Norte for the 2019 Local Elections to which he lost. He ran for and won as  Dipolog councilor in the 2022 Local Elections.
Roberto Y. Uy ran for Governor of Zamboanga del Norte in 2007, but was defeated by incumbent Governor Rolando E. Yebes. He briefly retired from politics, until he successfully ran for, won as, and served as Governor of Zamboanga del Norte from 2013 to 2022.
Evelyn T. Uy, after her tenure as City Mayor in 2016, made her run for City Mayor of Dapitan, Dipolog's neighboring city, in the 2019 Local Elections, but was defeated by incumbent Mayor Rosalina G. Jalosjos. She then made her run for Governor of Zamboanga del Norte facing Jalosjos again, but was defeated.

References

See also
2019 Zamboanga del Norte local elections
Local government in the Philippines

Dipolog
Politics of Zamboanga del Norte
Dipolog